The 1976 Indian Open was a men's tennis tournament played on outdoor clay courts in Bangalore, India. It was the fourth edition of the tournament and was held from 22 November through 28 November 1976. The tournament was part of the 1 Star tier of the Grand Prix tennis circuit. Kim Warwick won the singles title.

Finals

Singles
 Kim Warwick defeated  Sashi Menon 6–1, 6–2 or 6–1, 6–1
 It was Warwick's first singles title of his career.

Doubles
 Bob Carmichael /  Ray Ruffels defeated  Chiradip Mukerjea /  Bhanu Nunna 6–2, 7–6

Notes

References

External links
 ITF – tournament edition details

Indian Open
1976 in Indian tennis